

The Lapland Shield was a World War II German military decoration awarded to military personnel of General Franz Böhme’s 20th Mountain Army which fought a two-front campaign against advancing Finnish and Soviet Red Army forces in Lapland between November 1944 and the war’s end in May 1945. It was awarded to men who had "honorably served" for six months in the region or had been wounded during operations there. It was authorized in February 1945 and was the last officially instituted German campaign shield of the war. 

With the shield having been approved and designed shortly before the war's end, early recipients had the award noted in their military pay book in March 1945. However, presentation of the shield only began in July 1945, after Germany's surrender, with some awards recorded in pay books as late as August 1945.

Design
A basic shield with flat top and rounded base, it incorporates an eagle at the top but without a swastika. Directly below this, is "LAPPLAND" in capital letters, with a map of the region beneath. Four small holes were punched in the shield to allow it to be sewn on the upper left sleeve of the uniform, with no back-plate or uniform cloth section attached.

At the end of the war, while the disarmed German forces in Lapland were awaiting repatriation, they remained under the command of their own officers and had a functioning military bureaucracy. Although authorized earlier, it was only in this immediate post-war period that the Lapland Shield was manufactured and distributed. Locally produced, the awards were crudely made with variations in style and metal, with most made of aluminum or zinc. This post-war manufacture may explain the absence of the swastika symbol from the final design. 

The Lapland Shield was not among those Nazi era military decorations authorized for official wear by the Federal Republic of Germany in 1957.

See also

 Campaign shields (Wehrmacht)
 Cholm Shield
 Crimea Shield
 Demyansk Shield
 Kuban Shield
 Narvik Shield
 Warsaw Shield

Notes

References 

Military awards and decorations of Nazi Germany
Awards established in 1945
1945 establishments in Germany
German campaign medals